Ferdinand Albert I (22 May 1636 – 23 April 1687), a member of the House of Welf, was a Duke of Brunswick-Lüneburg. After a 1667 inheritance agreement in the Principality of Brunswick-Wolfenbüttel, he received the secundogeniture of Brunswick-Bevern, which he ruled until his death.

Life 
Ferdinand Albert was born in Brunswick, the fourth son of Duke Augustus the Younger, reigning Prince of Brunswick-Wolfenbüttel, from his third marriage with Duchess Elisabeth Sophie of Mecklenburg. Raised at his father's residence, the young man received a comprehensive education, with Justus Georg Schottel and Sigmund von Birken among his tutors.

After the father's death in 1666, the sons quarreled about the heritage. Eventually, Ferdinand Albert received the palace of Bevern near Holzminden, some feudal rights, and a certain amount of money in exchange for his claims to the government of Brunswick-Wolfenbüttel, which was to be ruled by his elder half-brothers Rudolph Augustus and Anthony Ulrich.

Ferdinand Albert joined the Royal Society in 1665 and was admitted to the Fruitbearing Society by Duke Augustus of Saxe-Weissenfels in 1673. Over the years, however, he grew more and more eccentric, and at some point his brothers had to send a military force to restore order at his palace. He collected many works of art, which later became part of the Herzog Anton Ulrich Museum in Brunswick. He died in 1687 at Bevern; his son and successor, Ferdinand Albert II, inherited the Principality of Brunswick-Wolfenbüttel decades later.

Family
Ferdinand Albert married Christine of Hesse-Eschwege (30 October 1648 - 18 March 1702), a daughter of Landgrave Frederick of Hesse-Eschwege, in 1667. They had the following children that reached adulthood:

 Sophia Eleanora (1674–1711), died childless
 Augustus Ferdinand (1677–1704), died childless
 Ferdinand Albert II  (1680–1735)
 Ferdinand Christian (1682–1706), died childless
 Ernest Ferdinand (1682–1746)
 Henry Ferdinand (1684–1706), died childless

Ancestors

References
 At the House of Welf site
 Allgemeine Deutsche Bibliographie, vol. 6, p. 679-681

1636 births
1687 deaths
Nobility from Braunschweig
House of Brunswick-Bevern
German art collectors
New House of Brunswick
Burials at Brunswick Cathedral